"When I Look to the Sky" is a song by the American rock band Train, for their third studio album My Private Nation. The song was featured in the trailer for the 2004 film Jersey Girl.

Music video
The music video portrays a relationship between the lead singer, Pat Monahan and his lover, Kiana Bessa.

Track listing 
 "When I Look to the Sky" (Edit)
 "When I Look to the Sky" (LP Version)
 "When I Look to the Sky" (Acoustic)
 "When I Look to the Sky" (Live)

Charts

Weekly charts

Year-end charts

Certifications

References

2004 singles
Train (band) songs
Song recordings produced by Brendan O'Brien (record producer)
Songs written by Pat Monahan
Rock ballads
2003 songs
Columbia Records singles